Jeremiah Sexton (born 20 January 1993) is a professional rugby union player from Ireland for English side the Doncaster Knights in the RFU Championship. Sexton primarily plays as a lock. He is the younger brother of Irish international player Johnny Sexton.

Sexton represented Leinster Rugby at schoolboy level but did not make the professional academy. He moved to France in 2013, playing for Auch Gers in French rugby's second tier competition the Pro D2. After one season with the French outfit, Sexton moved to the English Premiership, joining the Exeter Chiefs in 2014. He made his senior debut for Exeter Chiefs in the LV Cup against Gloucester in November 2014. In February 2016, he joined London Irish on loan for the remainder of the 2015–16 season.

It was announced in July 2017 that Sexton would leave London Irish and sign for Jersey Reds from the 2017–18 season. After two seasons at the club, Sexton left the English Championship side to join South African Pro14 side Southern Kings on a three-year contract ahead of the 2019–20 season.; he would return to Europe from South Africa a year early however following the liquidation of the Kings at the end of 2019-20, signing for Doncaster Knights ahead of the 2020–21 RFU Championship season.

References

1993 births
Living people
Rugby union players from Dublin (city)
Irish rugby union players
St Mary's College RFC players
Exeter Chiefs players
London Irish players
Jersey Reds players

Rugby union locks
Southern Kings players
Doncaster Knights players
CS Bourgoin-Jallieu players
Irish expatriate rugby union players
Irish expatriate sportspeople in Jersey
Irish expatriate sportspeople in France
Irish expatriate sportspeople in South Africa
Expatriate rugby union players in Jersey
Expatriate rugby union players in England
Expatriate rugby union players in France
Expatriate rugby union players in South Africa
Irish expatriate sportspeople in England